Douglas Morland (8 February 1944 – 4 September 2016) was a New Zealand cricketer. He played in one List A and six first-class matches for Central Districts from 1965 to 1974.

See also
 List of Central Districts representative cricketers

References

External links
 

1944 births
2016 deaths
New Zealand cricketers
Central Districts cricketers
Cricketers from Palmerston North